Kutnohorite is a rare calcium manganese carbonate mineral with magnesium and iron that is a member of the dolomite group. It forms a series with dolomite, and with ankerite. It was named by Professor Bukowsky in 1901 after the type locality of Kutná Hora, Bohemia, in the Czech Republic. It was originally spelt "kutnahorite" but "kutnohorite" is the current IMA-approved spelling.

Dolomite group 
dolomite, 
Ankerite, 
Kutnohorite, 
Minrecordite,

Unit cell 
There are three formula units per unit cell (Z = 3) and the lengths of the sides are a close to 4.9 Å and c between 16 Å and 17 Å, although different sources give slightly different values, as follows: 
a = 4.915 Å, c = 16.639 Å 
a = 4.8518(3) Å, c = 16.217(2) Å 
a = 4.85 Å, c = 16.34 Å

Structure 
The crystal class is trigonal , space group R, the same as for the other members of the dolomite group. If there were perfect ordering amongst the cations they would separate into different layers, giving rise to the ordered sequence:  along the c axis; not all specimens, however, display such ordering.

Optical properties 
Kutnohorite may be white, pale pink or light brown.  The pink shades are due to increased manganese and the brown colours are due to increased iron content.  The mineral is translucent with a white to pale pink streak and vitreous to dull luster.  It is uniaxial (-) with refractive indices No = 1.710 to 1.727 and Ne = 1.519 to 1.535, similar to dolomite.  The ordinary refractive index, No, is high, comparable with spinel (1.719).

Physical properties 
Kutnohorite occurs as aggregates of bundled blades of white through rose pink to light brown crystals.  Also as simple rhombs with curved faces, polycrystalline spherules and in massive and granular habits. It has perfect rhombohedral cleavage, typical of carbonates. It is brittle with a subconchoidal fracture and it is quite soft, with hardness 3.5 to 4, between calcite and fluorite.  Specific gravity is 3.12, denser than both dolomite and calcite.  It is soluble in acids, as are all carbonates.

Occurrence 
Kutnohorite occurs typically in manganiferous sediments, associated with rhodochrosite, aragonite and calcite. Notable occurrences include Tuscany, Italy and Kutná Hora, Czech Republic.
It probably occurs at the Trepča Mines, Stari Trg, Kosovo, in the Balkans. At the Eldorado Mine, Ouray County, Colorado, US, it occurs as tiny white crystals partially encrusting quartz and dolomite. 
At the Ryujima Mine, Nagano Prefecture in Japan, magnesian kutnohorite occurs with quartz and rhodochrosite. 
The type locality is Poličany, Kutná Hora, Central Bohemia Region, Bohemia, Czech Republic, and type material is conserved at Harvard University, Cambridge, Massachusetts, US.

References

External links 
JMol: http://rruff.geo.arizona.edu/AMS/viewJmol.php?id=01069

Carbonate minerals
Manganese(II) minerals
Dolomite group
Trigonal minerals
Minerals in space group 148